United Nations Security Council resolution 921, adopted unanimously on 26 May 1994, after considering a report by the Secretary-General Boutros Boutros-Ghali regarding the United Nations Disengagement Observer Force (UNDOF), the Council noted its efforts to establish a durable and just peace in the Middle East.

The resolution decided to call upon the parties concerned to immediately implement Resolution 338 (1973), it renewed the mandate of the Observer Force for another six months until 30 November 1994 and requested that the Secretary-General submit a report on the situation at the end of that period.

See also
 Arab–Israeli conflict
 Golan Heights
 Israel–Syria relations
 List of United Nations Security Council Resolutions 901 to 1000 (1994–1995)

References

External links
 
 Text of the Resolution at undocs.org

 0921
 0921
Arab–Israeli peace process
1994 in Israel
1994 in Syria
 0921
May 1994 events